Alba Raquel Barros (born 14 December 1952 in Santurce, Puerto Rico) is an actress, comedian, and dancer. She is better known for her acting career, and she has won many national awards for her work, both in the television and theatrical fields.

Biography 

Barros participated in a rendition of Tennessee Williams' A Streetcar Named Desire as a student at the University of Puerto Rico (UPR).

Barros began her rise to fame as a telenovela actress in Puerto Rico's channel 2 during the 1970s. She participated in some of that channel's most famous soap operas.

By the early 1980s, she had moved to WAPA-TV, where she acted in some of that channel's most famous shows, including 1982's soap, Yo Sé Que Mentía (I know he was lying), with Iris Chacón, the mini series, Las Divorciadas, (The Divorced Women), with Sonia Noemí and Maribella Garcia, as well as 1984's sitcom, Barrio Cuatro Calles. In the latter comedy she played a Puerto Rican girl who had been born in New York City therefore she used an Americanized, or Nuyorican, accent. She played the wife of Miguel Ángel Álvarez, who played a bakery owner. They played opposite legendary Cuban actor Pucho Fernández and Yasmín Mejías.

She has participated at the theatrical versions of many of Latin America's most famous novels, including La Carreta, Orinoco, La Clase del 69 and others.

The famous Chilean show host and producer, Don Francisco has invited Barros many times to his Univision show Sábado Gigante. Barros has participated as a comedian a number of times on that television show.

Barros' acting career has not been limited to television and theater, however, as she has participated in a number of Puerto Rico's most important productions of all times, including Nicolas y los demas (Nicholas and the others), directed by and starred Jacobo Morales, Héroes de Otra Patria (Heroes for Another Nation, which protested the participation of Puerto Ricans in the United States military, particularly during the Vietnam War era), and Los Diaz de Doris.

In 2002, Barros moved to Venezuela to act there, after being signed by Venevision.  She appeared in Ángel Rebelde as Simona Ramirez.

In 2008, she acted in Telemundo's El Rostro de Analía where she played Dionisia Valdez.

In 2010, she acted in Telemundo's Alguien Te Mira where she played Yoyita.

Awards
These are some of the awards Barros has received over the years:
 Outstanding comedy actress of the year (Puerto Rico, 1985)
 Comedian of the year (Puerto Rico, 1986)
 Best female actress (Puerto Rico, 1986)
 Best soap opera starring role (Puerto Rico, 1987)
 Best actress (Puerto Rico, 1988)
 Best actress in a supporting role, Critics Circle Award Theater of Puerto Rico (Puerto Rico, 1990)

Works

See also

 List of Puerto Ricans

References

External links
 

1952 births
Living people
Puerto Rican film actresses
Puerto Rican stage actresses
Puerto Rican soap opera actresses
Puerto Rican telenovela actresses
Puerto Rican television actresses
Puerto Rican comedians
People from San Juan, Puerto Rico
University of Puerto Rico alumni
21st-century American women